Yannick Gozzoli (born 26 June 1983) is a French chess grandmaster.

Chess career
Born in 1983 in Marseille, Gozzoli earned his international master title in 2003 and his grandmaster title in 2012. He is the No. 9 ranked French player as of August 2018. He tied for first in the 2018 French Chess Championship with Tigran Gharamian and Romain Édouard. Gharamian won the playoff.

References

External links

1983 births
Living people
Chess grandmasters
French chess players
Sportspeople from Marseille